The Junior International Quadrangular Tournament (most recently known as the Umbro Trophy for sponsorship reasons) is a football tournament held on an irregular basis between junior representative teams from Northern Ireland, the Republic of Ireland and Scotland and the Isle of Man national team. 'Junior' status does not refer to age, but to the status of the competing players, i.e. not senior. First held as the Guinness Cup in 1994, Guinness continued to sponsor the tournament until 2000. Statoil then acted as sponsors for three editions from 2001 until 2005. In 2008 Umbro became sponsors. Scotland are the tournament's most successful side having won six of the twelve editions.

Format
Each tournament is rotated around the competing teams who take it in turn to act as hosts. Initially the competition was held on a knock-out basis with two semi-finals followed by a third-place play-off and final. Since 2001 it has been held on a round-robin league basis, with each team facing each other once and three points being awarded for a win and one for a draw.

Event History

Republic of Ireland 1994
Final

 Northern Ireland were represented by a Mid Ulster Select.

Scotland 1995
Final

Isle of Man 1996
Final78

Northern Ireland 1997
Final

Republic of Ireland 1998
Final

Scotland 1999
Final

Isle of Man 2000
Final

Northern Ireland 2001

Republic of Ireland 2003

Scotland 2005

 Scotland finish ahead of the Republic of Ireland on head-to-head record.

Isle of Man 2008

Northern Ireland 2010

Republic of Ireland 2013
The 2013 Umbro Quadrangular Trophy took place in Limerick from 3–5 October 2013.

Scotland 2017
The 2017 Umbro Quadrangular Trophy took place in Glasgow from 11 to 14 October 2017.

Summary of winners

References

The Quadrangular Tournament, Scottish Junior Football Association

Quadrangular Tournament on scottishfa.co.uk

International association football competitions in Europe
Association football in Northern Ireland
Football in the Isle of Man
Football in Scotland
Association football in the Republic of Ireland